Jacqueline Boyer (born Eliane Ducos, 23 April 1941) is a French singer and actress. She is also the daughter of performers Jacques Pills and Lucienne Boyer.

In 1960, she won the Eurovision Song Contest for France singing "Tom Pillibi", with music composed by André Popp and lyrics by Pierre Cour. The resulting single reached #33 in the UK Singles Chart in May 1960. At 18 years and 341 days of age at the time of her victory, Boyer was the first teenager to win the contest and the youngest until 1964. Following the death of Lys Assia in 2018, Boyer as of 2022, 62 years after her victory, is the longest surviving winning singer of the Eurovision Song Contest (although not the oldest by age).

Filmography
Das Rätsel der grünen Spinne
Soldatensender Calais
Schlager-Raketen
 (1960)
Der nächste Urlaub kommt bestimmt
Auf den Flügeln bunter Träume
Flotte Formen – Kesse Kurven
So schön wie heut', so müßt' es bleiben

References

External links

 
 Tom Pillibi – lyrics and translation

1941 births
Living people
Actresses from Paris
French women singers
Eurovision Song Contest winners
Eurovision Song Contest entrants for France
Eurovision Song Contest entrants of 1960